The Anaconda Saddle Club, located at 2704 MT 1 W about five miles west of Anaconda, Montana, was built in 1945.  It was listed on the National Register of Historic Places in 2007.

It is a historic horse-boarding facility and social center.  The listing included 11 contributing buildings and four contributing structures.  The clubhouse, "perhaps the most unique building in Anaconda's West Valley", is a one-story octagonal structure, built starting in 1945, made of square-hewn logs resting on a concrete wall foundation.

References

National Register of Historic Places in Deer Lodge County, Montana
Buildings and structures completed in 1945
Historic districts in Montana
Log buildings and structures on the National Register of Historic Places in Montana
Octagonal buildings in the United States
Horses in the United States
Rustic architecture in Montana